Henry Paul (born August 25, 1949) is an American southern rock and country singer/songwriter who was an original recording member of the Southern rock band Outlaws. He left to form the Henry Paul Band but then returned to the Outlaws. He also is a founding member of the country band Blackhawk.

Biography

Early life
Henry was born in Kingston, New York, and lived on a farm in nearby Hurley, but when his father and mother divorced, Henry, his sisters Anselma and Helen, and his mother moved to Temple Terrace, a suburb of Tampa, Florida, as a young boy. At the age of 17, he played his first music gigs at High School folk festivals and playing at the 18th String Coffee House and Music Emporium in Tampa, and by 1969, he had moved back north to Greenwich Village, New York, to pursue a career in music. While living in New York he retraced the footsteps of his hero Bob Dylan and played on the streets to make a living while cutting demos for Epic Records. With an invitation to play a concert in his hometown, he returned to Tampa in 1971. There, Henry and Jim Fish formed the country rock group Sienna with future Outlaw members Monte Yoho and Frank O'Keefe.

The Outlaws
In 1972 the group Sienna disbanded and Paul joined the group "The Outlaws" which had been formed in 1967. They started playing clubs around the Tampa area and added Billy Jones. By 1974 they were on the road opening shows for several established Southern rock groups including Lynyrd Skynyrd. Clive Davis of Arista Records discovered them and signed the group to their first record deal; they became the fledgling label's first rock band. Their self-titled debut album quickly went gold on the success of hits like "Green Grass and High Tides," and "There Goes Another Love Song." In 1977, after recording two more albums with the Outlaws, Henry left to pursue a solo career.
Following the death of Hughie Thomasson, Paul became the bandleader of The Outlaws in the first lineup to not include Thomasson since the formation of the band. In 2012 the Outlaws released the critically acclaimed album, "It's About Pride". The band still tours extensively throughout the United States with the current lineup which includes Henry, Mike Bailey (drums), Randy Threet (bass guitar), Dave Robbins (keyboards), Jimmy Dormire (lead guitar) and Jeff Aulich(guitars).

Henry Paul Band
Within a year after leaving The Outlaws Henry founded the Henry Paul Band, debuting in 1979 with the album Grey Ghost. It included songs such as "So Long" and "Grey Ghost", which was dedicated to the memory of Lynyrd Skynyrd's Ronnie Van Zant. Henry Paul told Songfacts that he wrote "Lonely Dreamer" while visualizing a painting of a girl with the words "Lonely Dreamer" underneath. The band recorded three more albums including Feel The Heat in 1980, which had more of a rock edge and included the title track as well as "Whiskey Talkin'" and "Longshot" that went to #3 on the Billboard Bubbling Under The Hot 100 Singles Chart in 1980. Their third album was released in 1981, Anytime, included the hit "Keeping Our Love Alive" #50 on the Billboard Hot 100 Chart and #23 Billboard Top Tracks(Mainstream Rock Tracks Chart) in 1982 with background vocals by Richard Paige of Mr. Mister & Bill Champlin of Chicago. The album also featured a non-charted single "Living Without Your Love" that was played on some album rock stations, cover version of Van Morrison's "Brown Eyed Girl" #5 Billboard Bubbling Under The Hot 100 Singles Chart in 1982, and a live show highlight "Crazy Eyes". Henry's last, self-titled album was released in 1982, with the Henry Paul Band featured the songs "Hold On", Heat Of The Night" and the haunting song "Tragedy" .
During the Henry Paul Band era, he also did Voice over work at WYNF-FM (95ynf) in Tampa Bay, Florida .

In 1983, the Henry Paul Band disbanded as Paul reunited with Hughie Thomasson of the Outlaws. Their collaboration led to the 1986 release of The Outlaws' Soldiers of Fortune. Paul remained with the band until 1989, when he left again to start a new career in country music, founding BlackHawk in 1991. Van Stephenson and Dave Robbins joined Paul in BlackHawk to create a new blend of country music, using three-part harmonies and introspective songs.

Blackhawk

BlackHawk's No. 11 debut, "Goodbye Says It All", was heavily promoted on CMT during 1994. Following the platinum success of their self-titled debut album, they developed into a touring band. They have produced five studio albums, BlackHawk, Strong Enough, Love & Gravity, The Sky's the Limit, Spirit Dancer and one compilation album, Greatest Hits. They were nominated for Top New Vocal Group or Duet by the Academy of Country Music in 1994, but lost to Gibson/Miller Band. In 2002, the group left Arista for Columbia Records, with one album — 2002's Spirit Dancer — being released on that label. The 2008 lineup is signed to Radiance Records. In July 2014 BlackHawk released its first studio album in 12 years called "Brothers of the Southland." The title track is a tribute to Southern Rock bands and all those who have passed on.

References

External links 
 Henry Paul official webpage

American country rock singers
American country singer-songwriters
American male singer-songwriters
American country guitarists
American male guitarists
1949 births
Living people
Singer-songwriters from New York (state)
Musicians from Kingston, New York
Outlaws (band) members
Blackhawk (band) members
Guitarists from New York (state)
C. Leon King High School alumni
Musicians from Tampa, Florida
20th-century American guitarists
Country musicians from New York (state)
Country musicians from Florida
20th-century American male musicians
Singer-songwriters from Florida